Hugo Grenier (born 23 March 1996) is a French tennis player.

Grenier has a career high ATP singles ranking of World No. 95 achieved on 12 September 2022. He competes mainly on the ITF Men's Circuit and ATP Challenger Tour. He also has a career high ATP doubles ranking of World No. 362 achieved on 21 February 2022. Grenier has won 3 Challenger and 6 more ITF singles titles and 3 ITF doubles title on the ITF Men's World Tennis Tour.

Career

2021: ATP Tour singles main draw and top 150 debut, maiden ATP Challenger singles title
Grenier made his ATP Tour singles main draw debut at the 2021 Antalya Open, where he defeated Alex Molčan in the first round.

He also won his first Challenger tournament in Roanne, France.

2022: Grand Slam and top 100 debut 
He made his Grand Slam singles main draw debut as a lucky loser at the 2022 Wimbledon Championships where he won his first match in a Grand Slam singles main draw and just his second career ATP tour main draw singles match by defeating fellow first-time qualifier Marc-Andrea Hüsler in five sets in a close to 4 hours first round match. Later in the month of July, he won his second Challenger title at the 2022 Open Castilla y León dropping one set the whole week.

In August, he also made his debut at the US Open, entering the main draw as a Lucky Loser and beating Tomas Martin Etcheverry in the first round.

On 12 September, he broke into the Top 100 at world No. 95 after winning the Cassis Open Provence, defeating James Duckworth in the finals.

Challenger and Futures/World Tennis Finals

Singles: 19 (9–10)

References

External links
 
 

1996 births
Living people
French male tennis players
People from Montbrison, Loire
Sportspeople from Loire (department)